Melanin-concentrating hormone receptor 2 (MCH2) also known as G-protein coupled receptor 145 (GPR145) is a protein that in humans is encoded by the MCHR2 gene.

MCH2 is also found in dogs, ferrets, and some other primates and carnivores, but is not found in mice or rats. This has delayed research into the receptor as a therapeutic target, due to most early pharmaceutical research usually being conducted in small mammals such as mice, rats or rabbits which lack the MCH2 gene and its receptor product.

Clinical significance
Treatment of human cells expressing MCHR2 with MCH resulted in upregulation of IDH3A, PCK1 and PFKFB4 and the downregulation of INSIG2 and ACOT8.

See also
Melanin-concentrating hormone receptor

References

External links

Further reading

G protein-coupled receptors
Human proteins